Western Freeway may refer to:

Roads 
Western Freeway (Victoria), Australia
Western Freeway, Brisbane, Australia
M4 Western Motorway, formerly named the Western Freeway, Sydney, Australia 
Western Freeway (Mumbai), India
Western Freeway (Hampton Roads), Virginia, United States

Music 
Under the Western Freeway, an album

See also
 Western Expressway (disambiguation)